is a former breaststroke swimmer from Japan. She won the bronze medal in the 4 × 100 m Medley Relay at the 2000 Summer Olympics in Sydney, Australia. Her winning teammates in that race were Mai Nakamura, Junko Onishi, and Sumika Minamoto. She competed in three consecutive Summer Olympics, starting in 1996.

Dubbing

Animation 
Finding Dory, Striped marlin

References
 databaseOlympics
 Profile on FINA site

1979 births
Living people
Japanese female breaststroke swimmers
Olympic swimmers of Japan
Swimmers at the 1996 Summer Olympics
Swimmers at the 2000 Summer Olympics
Swimmers at the 2004 Summer Olympics
Olympic bronze medalists for Japan
World record setters in swimming
People from Hokkaido
Olympic bronze medalists in swimming
World Aquatics Championships medalists in swimming
Medalists at the FINA World Swimming Championships (25 m)
Asian Games medalists in swimming
Sportspeople from Hokkaido
Medalists at the 2000 Summer Olympics
Asian Games gold medalists for Japan
Asian Games silver medalists for Japan
Asian Games bronze medalists for Japan
Medalists at the 1994 Asian Games
Medalists at the 1998 Asian Games
Swimmers at the 1994 Asian Games
Swimmers at the 1998 Asian Games
Universiade medalists in swimming
Universiade gold medalists for Japan
Medalists at the 1997 Summer Universiade